Punta Campanella Lighthouse is an active lighthouse at the end of the south-western extremity of the Sorrentine Peninsula, Campania on the Tyrrhenian Sea.

Description
A 1-storey equipment shelter is in the base of the tower. The lighthouse is completely automated and powered by a solar unit and operated by the Marina Militare with the identification code number 2593.3 E.F.

See also
 List of lighthouses in Italy
 Sorrentine Peninsula

References

External links
 Servizio Fari Marina Militare

Lighthouses in Italy